Guazacapán is an extinct Xincan language that was spoken in the region of Guazacapán in Santa Rosa Department, Guatemala.

References

 Campbell, Lyle (1997). American Indian languages: The historical linguistics of Native America. New York: Oxford University Press. .

External links 
Xinca Guazacapán resources in the Archive of the Indigenous Languages of Latin America:

Xinca Guazacapán 1
Xinca Guazacapán 2
Xinca Guazacapán 3
Juan Benito 1 and 2

Xincan languages
Languages extinct in the 1990s
Languages of Guatemala
Extinct languages of North America